Jacquemin is a French surname.  Notable people with the surname include:

 Alexis Jacquemin (1938–2004), Belgian economist
 Jeanne Jacquemin, French artist
 Michel Jacquemin (born 1942), Belgian racing cyclist
 Victor Jacquemin (1892–?), Belgian sprinter

French-language surnames